Antony Hudgell (born 8 October 2014 as Antony Simpson), is an English fundraiser and recipient of the Pride of Britain Award and UK Points of Light award.

In 2020, aged five, inspired by Captain Tom Moore’s fundraising walk, he walked  on his prosthetic legs throughout June 2020 and raised £1.8 million for the Evelina London Children's Hospital (NHS), where he had received care after receiving life-changing injuries inflicted by his birth parents when he was a baby. 

Hudgell has also inspired an English law change to increase prison sentences for those convicted of child cruelty and neglect.

Early life 
Originally known as Antony Smith, Hudgell was the son of birth parents Jody Simpson and Tony Smith, from Whitstable, Kent. In their Maidstone flat, described by the Kent and Sussex Courier as "filthy", the couple inflicted such severe injuries on their six-week-old baby that his legs eventually had to be amputated. He had been assaulted at 41 days old, resulting in multiple fractures, dislocations and blunt trauma to the face. He was left untreated and in agony for 10 days, causing organ failure, toxic shock and sepsis. 

The younger Smith was treated at Evelina London Children's Hospital; he suffered eight limb fractures and head trauma which left him deaf in one ear, and had to have 23 operations and eight blood transfusions. Aged three, he had a double amputation at the knees, and his hip is permanently dislocated. He was adopted by Mark and Paula Hudgell of Kings Hill in Kent, and renamed Tony Hudgell.

In the 2023 New Year Honours, Paula Hudgell was appointed OBE for services to children.

Birth parents' convictions
In February 2018, his birth parents were convicted of child cruelty offences and given 10-year prison sentences (the maximum then available) at Maidstone Crown Court. Simpson and Smith later applied for their sentences to be reduced; Simpson subsequently discontinued her appeal, while Smith's appeal was rejected.  While in prison in August 2018, Smith was attacked by fellow inmates at HMP Swaleside. After serving five years in prison, including time spent on remand before their trial, Smith and Simpson were set to be released in August 2022. The case of Simpson, earlier transferred to an open prison and who was set to be released at the halfway point on 12 August 2022, was referred to the Parole Board by the Justice Secretary Dominic Raab. On 28 August 2022, Smith's release was also placed on hold and his case referred to the Parole Board. In December 2022, the High Court ruled Raab's bid to delay the release of Simpson from prison was unlawful. Raab appealed against the decision but was overruled, and in February 2023 Simpson was released.

Life after injury

Fundraising
In June 2020, aged five and inspired by Captain Tom Moore's NHS fundraising during the COVID-19 pandemic, Tony Hudgell set out to raise £500 for Evelina London Children's Hospital by walking  on his prosthetic legs. The figure quickly topped £1 million, with the final amount raised totalling £1.7 million.

The Tony Hudgell Foundation aims to enhance the lives of children who have been affected by physical, emotional and psychological abuse.

Awards
Hudgell received a Points of Light award in September 2020. At a Points of Light reception at 10 Downing Street on 9 August 2022, Hudgell was thanked by the UK Prime Minister Boris Johnson for his fundraising efforts, and for inspiring legal changes — 'Tony's Law' — to prevent future suffering.

Hudgell was also presented with a Pride of Britain Award in November 2020, under the ‘Good Morning Britain Young Fundraiser’ category and received a British Citizen Youth Award at the House of Lords in October 2021.

Football
In September 2020, Hudgell became the first-team mascot of Kings Hill FC. A supporter of Chelsea, he was presented with Chelsea UEFA Champions League tickets on his 7th birthday on the ITV breakfast show This Morning in October 2021, and he joined the English Lionheart squad, the Football Association's group of 23 everyday heroes - "inspirational individuals who went above and beyond during the nation’s fight against the COVID-19 pandemic".

'Tony's Law'
In 2018, the Hudgells started a petition to campaign for tougher sentences for child cruelty and neglect, and their cause was taken up by their local MP for Tonbridge and Malling, Tom Tugendhat, who introduced a Child Cruelty (Sentences) Bill in the House of Commons in 2019. The Bill did not progress after the December 2019 United Kingdom general election, but in September 2020 Tugendhat urged its reintroduction and the government said it would hold further discussions.

'Tony's Law' was eventually enacted in the Police, Crime, Sentencing and Courts Act 2022 and introduced tougher sentencing powers, including potential life sentences, for child abusers in England and Wales. The maximum sentence for causing or allowing a child's death was increased from 14 years to life, while the maximum penalty for causing serious harm to a child was increased from 10 to 14 years.

References

External links
 Tony Hudgell Foundation website

2014 births
Living people
Fundraising
British amputees
Charity events in the United Kingdom
People from Tonbridge and Malling (district)
Child abuse incidents and cases
Charity fundraisers (people)
English children